The Caramoan National Park is a  national park and protected area in Camarines Sur, Philippines. It was established in 1938. The park has caves, limestone formations, white sandy beaches, an islet lake and a subterranean river, make it popular with tourists. It is accessible by public transport from the municipality of Caramoan, and local people have established trails in the park for visitors.

Geography

The national park is located in the Caramoan Peninsula, a hilly peninsula in north-east Camarines Sur, Bicol Region, Philippines with deep gorges and a rough, rocky terrain. It is also an Important Bird Area with habitat for the green racket-tail (Prioniturus luconensis).

See also
List of national parks of the Philippines

References

Peninsulas of the Philippines
National parks of the Philippines
Beaches of the Philippines
Protected areas established in 1938
Landforms of Camarines Sur
Tourist attractions in Camarines Sur